Robert Mitchell Jones (born April 11, 1972) is an American former professional baseball pitcher. He played in Major League Baseball (MLB) during six seasons between 1997 and 2004. He made his MLB debut on May 18, 1997, for the Colorado Rockies. From 2016–2022, Jones served as manager for the Sussex County Miners of the Frontier League. He currently is the Vice President and Chief Baseball Officer for the New Jersey Jackals of the Frontier League.

Jones moved to Rutherford, New Jersey, in 1981 and played in Rutherford Little League from 1982 to 1984. In 1991, he was drafted by the Milwaukee Brewers in the 44th round as a draft-and-follow. He signed prior to the 1992 draft and was assigned to Helena in the Pioneer League (rookie), where he went 5–4.

Jones operated his own baseball academy named Bobby Jones Sports in Montville, New Jersey, until it was closed down. Jones also spent time as the pitching coach for both the Don Bosco Prep and Montclair Mounties varsity baseball teams. He also worked with the Academy of Pro Players located in Hawthorne, New Jersey, as a pitching instructor.

Minor league
Following the 1994 season, the Colorado Rockies chose Jones in the minor league phase of the Rule V Draft.

In , Jones spent most of the season with the New Haven Ravens (Eastern League, Double-A), who lost the league championship series to Reading. Around the All-Star break, he spent a month with the Colorado Springs Sky Sox (Pacific Coast League, Triple-A).

Major league career
Jones made his major league debut at Shea Stadium against his boyhood team, the New York Mets. He got a no-decision in that game, won by the Mets, but earned the victory in his next start, against the Houston Astros.

In early , the Rockies traded Jones to the Mets, meaning he and Bobby J. Jones were now on the same roster. The two had faced each other in a 1999 game, with the Rockies' pitcher earning the victory.

Jones spent the  season on the disabled list, but came back to the Mets in  before being traded to the San Diego Padres, coincidentally becoming reunited there with Bobby J. Jones. He spent  in Triple-A, starting with the Richmond Braves and finishing with the Omaha Royals. He was a non-roster invitee in  Boston Red Sox spring training and made the big club from there, but then went into rehabilitation. In , Jones was signed by the Detroit Tigers, pitching for Double-A Erie.

References

External links
, or Retrosheet, or Pura Pelota (Venezuelan Winter League)
Two former baseball coaches sue over alleged wrongful firing

1972 births
Living people
African-American baseball players
Baseball players from New Jersey
Beloit Brewers players
Binghamton Mets players
Boston Red Sox players
Charlotte Knights players
Chipola Indians baseball players
Colorado Rockies players
Colorado Springs Sky Sox players
Erie SeaWolves players
Helena Brewers players
Major League Baseball pitchers
Minor league baseball managers
New Haven Ravens players
New York Mets players
Newark Bears players
Norfolk Tides players
Omaha Royals players
People from Orange, New Jersey
People from Rutherford, New Jersey
Richmond Braves players
Rockland Boulders players
San Diego Padres players
Sportspeople from Bergen County, New Jersey
Sportspeople from Manhattan
Baseball players from New York City
St. Lucie Mets players
Stockton Ports players
Tiburones de La Guaira players
American expatriate baseball players in Venezuela
21st-century African-American sportspeople
20th-century African-American sportspeople